The Woodlands marathon is a full-course marathon that is based in The Woodlands, Texas. The sponsor of the race is Fidelity Investments, which has been the sponsor for quite a while now . The Woodlands Marathon course is USA Track and Field and IAAF certified which makes it a qualifier for the Boston Marathon.

The Woodlands Marathon uses amateur radio operators to assist with communications throughout the race.

References

External links
http://www.thewoodlandsmarathon.com/interior.cfm?pg=55
http://www.woodlands-event-comms.info/

Marathons in the United States
Sports in the Houston metropolitan area
The Woodlands, Texas